Samp is dried and partially broken maize kernels.

Samp or SAMP may also refer to:
 Samp (surname)
 Security Attribute Modulation Protocol, a network protocol
 An open source software stack comparable to LAMP (software bundle)
 An element in Hypertext Markup Language (HTML)
 The Samps, US rock band
 San Andreas Multi-Player, a MMOG mod for the PC version of Rockstar Games's Grand Theft Auto: San Andreas.
 U.C. Sampdoria, an Italian association football club based in Genoa
 (S)-1-amino-2-methoxymethylpyrrolidine, a chiral auxiliary used in the Enders SAMP/RAMP hydrazone-alkylation reaction
 South Asian Microform Project, a program under the Center for Research Libraries
 Samp., taxonomic author abbreviation of Gonçalo Sampaio (1865–1937), Portuguese botanist